HIP 67522 b is a hot Jupiter exoplanet orbiting the G-type star HIP 67522, located approximately 415 light-years from Earth in the constellation Centaurus, discovered using the Transiting Exoplanet Survey Satellite (TESS). It is currently the youngest hot Jupiter discovered, at an age of only 17 million years; it is also one of the youngest transiting planets of any type, and one of only four others less than 100 million years old (along with AU Mic b, V1298 Tau c, DS Tuc Ab and TOI-942 b) to have the angle between its orbit and its host star's rotation measured, at  degrees. This planet, in turn, may help in knowing how other hot Jupiters form.

Due to its young age, it has not reached its final size, due to the Kelvin–Helmholtz mechanism, which occurs as a result of the planet itself cooling, causing its internal pressure to drop, which will in turn cause the planet to shrink. Its final size will depend on the composition of its core.

There is also evidence that another planet might also be present in the planetary system.

References

Exoplanets discovered in 2020
Exoplanets discovered by TESS
Hot Jupiters
Transiting exoplanets